Podadenia is a genus of plant of the family Euphorbiaceae first described as a genus in 1821. At present, only species is recognized in the genus, Podadenia sapida, endemic to Sri Lanka.

formerly included
moved to Ptychopyxis 
Podadenia javanica J.J.Sm., synonym of Ptychopyxis javanica (J.J.Sm.) Croizat

References

Pycnocomeae
Monotypic Euphorbiaceae genera
Flora of Sri Lanka